The 1989 Eagle Classic was a men's tennis tournament played on outdoor hard courts in Scottsdale, Arizona in the United States that was part of World Championship Tennis and the 1989 Nabisco Grand Prix. It was the fourth edition of the tournament and took place from March 6 through March 13, 1989. First-seeded Ivan Lendl won the singles title.

Finals

Singles

 Ivan Lendl defeated  Stefan Edberg 6–2, 6–3
 It was Lendl's 2nd singles title of the year and the 75th of his career.

Doubles

 Rick Leach /  Jim Pugh defeated  Paul Annacone /  Christo van Rensburg 6–7, 6–3, 6–2, 2–6, 6–4
 It was Leach's 2nd title of the year and the 12th of his career. It was Pugh's 2nd title of the year and the 12th of his career.

See also
 1989 Virginia Slims of Arizona – women's tournament in Scottsdale
 Edberg–Lendl rivalry

References

External links
 ITF tournament edition details